The Roman Catholic Church in Costa Rica consists only of a Latin hierarchy, joint in the national Episcopal conference of Costa Rica, comprising only one ecclesiastical province headed by a Metropolitan archbishop, with seven suffragan dioceses each headed by a bishop.

There are no eastern Catholic, pre-diocesan or other exempt jurisdictions.

There are no titular sees. All defunct jurisdictions have current successor sees.

There is an Apostolic Nunciature to Costa Rica as papal diplomatic representation (embassy) level) in national capital San José de Costa Rica.

Current Latin Dioceses

Ecclesiastical province of San José de Costa Rica  
 Metropolitan Archdiocese of San José de Costa Rica
 Roman Catholic Diocese of Alajuela
 Roman Catholic Diocese of Cartago in Costa Rica
 Roman Catholic Diocese of Ciudad Quesada
 Roman Catholic Diocese of Limón
 Roman Catholic Diocese of Puntarenas
 Roman Catholic Diocese of San Isidro de El General
 Roman Catholic Diocese of Tilarán.

See also 
 List of Catholic dioceses (structured view)

References

Sources and external links 
 GCatholic.org - data for all sections.
 Catholic-Hierarchy entry.

Costa Rica
Catholic dioceses